The Church of the Open Word is a historic Swedenborgian church building located at 19 Highland Avenue in the village of Newtonville, in Newton, Massachusetts. The congregation was organized in 1860 and a wooden chapel was erected on the rear of this property. The stone Gothic Revival building was erected on the front of the property in 1893.

The building is a contributing property in the Newtonville Historic District, which was added to the National Register of Historic Places on September 4, 1986.

See also
National Register of Historic Places listings in Newton, Massachusetts

References

External links
 City of Newton real property database for church

Historic district contributing properties in Newton, Massachusetts
Swedenborgian churches in Massachusetts
Religious organizations established in 1860
Gothic Revival church buildings in Massachusetts
Churches completed in 1893
19th-century Swedenborgian church buildings
Swedenborgian Church of North America
Churches in Newton, Massachusetts
Stone churches in Massachusetts
1860 establishments in Massachusetts
Historic district contributing properties in Massachusetts
National Register of Historic Places in Newton, Massachusetts